This is a list of women artists who were born in Ukraine or whose artworks are closely associated with that country.

A
Emma Andijewska (born 1931), poet, painter
Kateryna Antonovych (1884–1975), artist, children's book illustrator and professor of art history

B
Marie Bashkirtseff (1858–1884), diarist, painter, sculptor
Tatiana Belokonenko (active since 1999), Ukrainian-born figurative painter now in Israel
Kateryna Vasylivna Bilokur (1900–1961), folk artist
Seraphima Blonskaya (1870–1947), painter
Kateryna Boloshkevich (1939–2018), weaver

C
Olena Chekan (1946–2013), film, stage and television actress, voice artist, television screenwriter and editor, political journalist and social activist, columnist, short story writer, essayist, humanist and feminist

D
Daria Denisova (born 1989), painter, book illustrator
Daria Dorosh (born 1943), Ukrainian-American artist, educator, activist
Sonia Delaunay (1885–1979), Ukrainian-French painter and designer

E
Aleksandra Ekster (1882–1949), painter, designer

G
Nina Genke-Meller (1893–1954), painter, designer, scenographer
Victoria Gres (born 1964), fashion designer
Olga Gurski (1902–1975), painter

H
Olesya Hudyma (born 1980), artist, poet, journalist

K
Anna K (born 1995), fashion designer
Myroslava Kot (1933–2014), embroiderer, educator
Victoria Kovalchuk (1954–2021), illustrator, designer, writer

L
Oksana Lytvyn (born 1961), textile artist

M
Alisa Margolis (born 1975), painter
Anastasiya Markovich (born 1979), painter

N
Donia Nachshen (1903–1987), illustrator, poster artist

O
Katerina Omelchuk (born 1982), painter
Chana Orloff (1888–1968), sculptor

P
Alina Panova (born 1961), costume designer
Anna Ivanovna Petrova (born 1962), painter, monument restorer
Yuliya Polishchuk (born 1983), fashion designer
Tetiana Protcheva (born 1962), embroiderer
Maria Prymachenko (1908–1997), folk art painter
Sasha Putrya (1977–1989), child artist

R
Olga Rapay-Markish (1929–2012), ceramist

S
Halyna Sevruk (1929–2022), painter, ceramist
Kseniya Simonova (born 1985), artist, sand animator
Marina Skugareva (born 1962), painter

V
Valentina (1899–1989), fashion designer

Y
Tetyana Yablonska (1917–2005), painter
Yelena Yemchuk (born 1970), photographer, painter, film director

Z
 Natasha Zinko (active since 2007), jewellery designer
 Halyna Zubchenko (1929–2000), painter, social activist

-
Ukrainian women artists, List of
Artists
Artists